The Ponca (Páⁿka iyé: Páⁿka or Ppáⁿkka pronounced ) are a Midwestern Native American tribe of the Dhegihan branch of the Siouan language group. There are two federally recognized Ponca tribes: the Ponca Tribe of Nebraska and the Ponca Tribe of Indians of Oklahoma. Their oral history states they originated as a tribe east of the Mississippi River in the Ohio River valley area and migrated west for game and as a result of Iroquois wars.

The term Ponca was the name of a clan among the Kansa, Osage, and Quapaws. The meaning of the name is "Those Who Lead."

Early history

At first European contact, the Ponca lived around the mouth of the Niobrara River in northern Nebraska. According to tradition, they moved there from an area east of the Mississippi just before Columbus' arrival in the Americas. Siouan-speaking tribes such as the Omaha, Osage, Quapaw and Kaw also have traditions of having migrated to the West from east of the Mississippi River.  The invasions of the Iroquois from their traditional base in the north pushed those tribes out of the Ohio River area.  Scholars are not able to determine precisely when the Dhegiha Siouan tribes migrated west, but know the Iroquois also pushed tribes out from the Ohio and West Virginia areas in the Beaver Wars. The Iroquois maintained the lands as hunting grounds.

The Ponca appear on a 1701 map by Pierre-Charles Le Sueur, who placed them along the upper Missouri. In 1789, fur trader Juan Baptiste Munier was given an exclusive license to trade with the Ponca at the mouth of the Niobrara River.  He founded a trading post at its confluence with the Missouri, where he found about 800 Ponca residing. Shortly after that, the tribe was hit by a devastating smallpox epidemic.  In 1804, when they were visited by the Lewis and Clark Expedition, only about 200 Ponca remained. Later in the 19th century, their number rose to about 700.

Most of the leadership of the Ponca people was destroyed in 1824. Hostile Lakotas attacked a delegation of 30 leaders of various rank returning from a visit in a friendly Oglala Lakota camp. Only twelve survived. "Numbered among the dead were all the Ponca chiefs, including the famous Smoke-maker ...".

Unlike most other Plains Indians, the Ponca grew maize and kept vegetable gardens. Their last successful buffalo hunt was in 1855.

Treaties with the United States
In 1817 the tribe signed a peace treaty with the United States.  By a second treaty in 1825, they  regulated trade and tried to minimize intertribal clashes on the Northern Plains.  In 1858 the Ponca signed a treaty by which they gave up parts of their land to the United States in return for protection from hostile tribes and a permanent reservation home on the Niobrara.  The Ponca signed their last treaty with the US in 1865. In the 1868 US-Sioux Treaty of Fort Laramie the US mistakenly included all Ponca lands in the Great Sioux Reservation.  Conflict between the Ponca and the Sioux/Lakota, who now claimed the land as their own by US law, forced the US to remove the Ponca from their own ancestral lands.

Relocation
When Congress decided to remove several northern tribes to Indian Territory (present-day Oklahoma) in 1876, the Ponca were on the list. After inspecting the lands the US government offered for their new reservation and finding it unsuitable for agriculture, the Ponca chiefs decided against a move to the Indian Territory.  Hence, when governmental officials came in early 1877 to move the Ponca to their new land, the chiefs refused, citing their earlier treaty.  Most of the tribe refused and had to be moved by force. In their new location, the Ponca struggled with malaria, a shortage of food and the hot climate.  One in four members died within the first year.

Standing Bear

Chief Standing Bear was among those who had most vehemently protested the tribe's removal.  When his eldest son, Bear Shield, lay on his deathbed, Standing Bear promised to have him buried on the tribe's ancestral lands. In order to carry out his promise, Standing Bear left the reservation in Oklahoma and traveled back toward the Ponca homelands. He was arrested for doing so without US government permission and ordered confined at Fort Omaha.  Many people took up his cause, and two prominent attorneys offered their services pro bono.  Standing Bear filed a habeas corpus suit challenging his arrest. In Standing Bear v. Crook (1879), held in Omaha, Nebraska, the US District Court established for the first time that Native Americans are "persons within the meaning of the law" of the United States, and that they have certain rights as a result.  This was an important civil rights case.

Nebraska

In 1881, the US returned 26,236 acres (106 km2) of Knox County, Nebraska to the Ponca, and about half the tribe moved back north from Indian Territory.  The tribe continued to decline.

In the 1930s, the University of Nebraska and the Smithsonian Institution conducted an archeological project 
to identify and save prehistoric artifacts before they were destroyed during agricultural development.  The team excavated a prehistoric Ponca village, which included large circular homes up to sixty feet in diameter, located almost two miles (3 km) along the south bank of the Niobrara River.

After World War II, the US government began a policy of terminating its relationship with tribes.  In 1966, the US federal government terminated the tribe (then called the Northern Ponca).  It distributed its land by allotment to members, and sold off what it called  surplus. Many individuals sold off their separate allotments over the decades, sometimes being tricked by speculators.

In the 1970s, the tribe started efforts to reorganize politically.  Members wanted to revive the cultural identity of its people and improve their welfare.  First, they sought state recognition and then allied with their Congressional representatives to seek legislation for federal recognition.  On October 31, 1990, the Ponca Restoration Bill was signed into law, and they were recognized as the Ponca Tribe of Nebraska. They are now trying to rebuild a land base on their ancestral lands.  They are the only federally recognized tribe in Nebraska without a reservation.

Today the Ponca Tribe of Nebraska has over 2,783 enrolled members and is headquartered in Niobrara, Nebraska.

Oklahoma

After the 1877 forced relocation onto the Quapaw Reservation in Indian Territory, the tribe moved west to their own lands along the Arkansas and Salt Fork Rivers. The full-bloods formed a tipi village, while the mixed-bloods settled about Chikaskia River.  During opposition by Ponca leadership, the US government began dismantling tribal government under the Curtis Act.  In an attempt to encourage assimilation (and to allow Oklahoma to become a state), they allotted reservation lands to individual members under the Dawes Act in 1891 and 1892.  Any land remaining after allotment was made available for sale to non-natives.

After Oklahoma achieved statehood, some remaining Ponca land was leased or sold to the 101 Ranch, where many Ponca people found employment.  The 1911 discovery of oil on Ponca lands provided revenues but had mixed results.  There were environmental disasters as oil refineries dumped waste directly into the Arkansas River.

In 1918, two Ponca men, Frank Eagle and Louis McDonald, helped co-found the Native American Church.

In 1950 the tribe organized a new government under the Oklahoma Indian Welfare Act.  They adopted their tribal constitution on 20 September 1950.

Today the tribe is headquartered in White Eagle, Oklahoma.  It conducts business from Ponca City.  The Ponca Tribe of Oklahoma has over 4200 members.

Notable Ponca
 Carter Camp, AIM (American Indian Movement) leader
 Brett Chapman, attorney and Native American rights advocate
 Tommy Morrison, former heavyweight boxer/co-star in Rocky V movie
 Chief White Eagle, chief and civil rights advocate
 Susette La Flesche, civil rights activist, writer, lecturer, interpreter, artist
 Paladine Roye, painter, 1946–2001
 Ponka-We Victors, Kansas state legislator
 Clyde Warrior, activist for Native self-determination
 Standing Bear, chief and civil rights advocate

See also
 Native American tribes in Nebraska
 Ponca Fort

Notes

References
 Clark, C. Blue. Indian Tribes of Oklahoma: A Guide. Norman: University of Oklahoma Press, 2009. .
 Dorsey, James Owen. Omaha and Ponka Letters. Washington: Government Printing Office, 1891.
 Dando-Collins, Stephen. Standing Bear is a Person. Cambridge, MA: Da Capo, 2004..
 Rollins, Willard H. The Osage: An Ethnohistorical Study of Hegemony on the Prairie-Plains. Columbia: University of Missouri Press, 1995.

External links

 Ponca Tribe of Nebraska
 Ponca Tribe of Oklahoma
 Information about the Ponca "An Indian is a person": U.S. District Court Case of Standing Bear vs. George Crook, 1879
 

 
Plains tribes
Dhegiha Siouan peoples
Native American tribes in Nebraska
Native American tribes in Oklahoma